Woodbank, also known as Rasmussen Cottage, was a historic home located on Lake Maxinkuckee in Union Township, Marshall County, Indiana.  It was a -story, Late Victorian style summer cottage built in 1894. It has been demolished.

It was listed on the National Register of Historic Places in 1982, and removed in 2014.

References

Former National Register of Historic Places in Indiana
Houses on the National Register of Historic Places in Indiana
Houses completed in 1894
Buildings and structures in Marshall County, Indiana
National Register of Historic Places in Marshall County, Indiana